was a Japanese domain of the Edo period.  It was associated with  Bingo Province and Bitchū Province in modern-day Hiroshima Prefecture.

In the han system, Fukuyama was a political and economic abstraction based on periodic cadastral surveys and projected agricultural yields.  In other words, the domain was defined in terms of kokudaka, not land area. This was different from the feudalism of the West.

List of daimyōs 
The hereditary daimyōs were head of the clan and head of the domain.

Mizuno clan, 1619–1698 (fudai; 101,000 koku)

Katsunari
Katsutoshi
Katsusada
Katsutane
Katsumine

Tenryō, 1698–1700.
Matsudaira (Okudaira) clan, 1700–1710 (fudai; 100,000 koku)

Tadamasa

Abe clan, 1710–1871 (fudai; 100,000 → 110,000 koku)

Masakuni
Masayoshi
Masasuke
Masatomo
Masakiyo
Masayasu
Masahiro
Masanori
Masakata
Masatake

See also 
 List of Han
 Abolition of the han system

References

External links
 "Fukuyama" at Edo 300  

Domains of Japan
Abe clan
Mizuno clan
Okudaira-Matsudaira clan